Kallman is a surname of the following people:

Brent Kallman (born 1990), American association football player 
Brian Kallman (born 1984), American association football player, brother of Brent 
Chester Kallman (1921–1975), American poet, librettist and translator
Craig Kallman, American businessperson and music executive
Dick Kallman (1933–1980), American actor
Jonas Källman (born 1981), Swedish handball player
Kassey Kallman (born 1992), American association football player, sister of Brian and Brent

See also
Kallman–Rota inequality in mathematics
Kallmann (disambiguation)
Callmann
Kallmann syndrome
Kalman (disambiguation)